Guerrino Ghedina (born 11 December 1956) is an Italian bobsledder. He competed in the two man and the four man events at the 1984 Winter Olympics.

References

External links
 

1956 births
Living people
Italian male bobsledders
Olympic bobsledders of Italy
Bobsledders at the 1984 Winter Olympics
People from Cortina d'Ampezzo
Sportspeople from the Province of Belluno